Windy is a Czech company providing interactive weather forecasting services worldwide.

The portal was founded by Ivo Lukačovič in November 2014. Initially, the portal focused on wind animation, currently there are other basic meteorological parameters such as temperature, pressure, relative humidity, cloud base and additional panels with more advanced data. The wind animation is based on the open sources project of Cameron Beccario earth.

List of weather models

Global models
 GFS (Resolution 22 km)
 ECMWF (Resolution 9 km)
 ICON by German DWD (Resolution 6 km for Europe, 13 km for global)

Local models
 NEMS by Swiss company MeteoBlue (Resolution 4 km for Europe)
 NAM Conus by NOAA (Resolution 5 km for continental US)
 NAM Alaska (Resolution 6 km for Alaska)
 NAM Hawaii (Resolution 4 km for Hawaii)
 AROME by Météo-France (Resolution 1.25 km for France, Germany and the Alps)

References

External links
 
 Community Windy

Meteorological companies
Weather prediction